Shawn Stevens is an American politician and businessman serving as a member of the Ohio House of Representatives from the 68th district. He assumed office on March 9, 2022.

Education 
Stevens earned a Bachelor of Arts degree in economics from Miami University and a Master of Business Administration from the Fisher College of Business at Ohio State University.

Career 
From 2004 to 2011, Stevens worked as a banker at JPMorgan Chase. He served as chair of the Delaware County Republican Party from 2010 to 2014 and president of the Ohio Association of Election Officials in 2015 and 2016. From 2011 to 2017, he was a partner at the Great American Title Agency. Stevens is the owner of Bridge Title and Escrow Services in Westerville, Ohio. In March 2022, Stevens was appointed to succeed Rick Carfagna in the Ohio House of Representatives.

References 

Living people
Republican Party members of the Ohio House of Representatives
People from Delaware County, Ohio
Miami University alumni
Ohio State University alumni
Year of birth missing (living people)